Otto Edward Henry Wucherer (7 July 1820 – 7 May 1873) was a Brazilian physician and naturalist, born to a Dutch mother and German father.

He was born in Oporto, later moving to Hamburg, where he worked in a pharmacy. He studied medicine at the University of Tübingen, receiving his doctorate in 1841 as a pupil of Ferdinand Gottlieb von Gmelin. He later practiced in London at St Bartholomew's Hospital and in Lisbon. In 1843 he relocated to Brazil, eventually settling as a doctor in Salvador, Bahia, where he lived until 1871. Together with John Ligertwood Paterson and José Francisco da Silva Lima, he co-founded the Escola Tropicalista da Bahia (Bahia School of Tropical Medicine).

He discovered the filaria larvae in Bahia. His name is associated with the roundworm genus Wuchereria, and he is commemorated in the scientific names of two species of reptiles, Elapomorphus wuchereri and Leposternon wuchereri. He described the snake species Atractus guentheri and Xenopholis scalaris.

He was co-founder of the journal Gazeta Médica da Bahia.

References

Further reading
Firkin BG, Whitworth JA (1987). Dictionary of Medical Eponyms. Parthenon Publishing. .
Peard, Julyan G. (1999). Race, Place and Medicine: The Idea of the Tropics in Nineteenth-Century Brazilian Medicine. Durham, North Carolina: Duke University Press. .

1820 births
1873 deaths
19th-century Brazilian physicians
People from Porto
19th-century Portuguese physicians
Brazilian herpetologists